Byrd Street Station was a railroad station in Richmond, Virginia. Originally established in 1887 as a joint-project between the Richmond and Petersburg Railroad and the Richmond, Fredericksburg and Potomac Railroad, the station served passengers traveling north and south through Richmond. In 1919, the new Union Station on Broad Street became the main station for the RF&P and the R&P's successor, the Atlantic Coast Line Railroad. Consequently, Byrd Street Station fell into disuse. The second and third floors were removed around the late 1950s while the first floor remained until the late 1960s/early 1970s. Today, the site of the railroad station is home to the Federal Reserve Bank of Richmond.

References

Railway stations opened in 1887
Railway stations closed in 1958
Former railway stations in Virginia
Railway stations in Virginia
Transportation in Richmond, Virginia
Buildings and structures in Richmond, Virginia
Railway stations in the United States opened in 1887